Kadeem Phillip (born 25 November 1989) is an Antiguan cricketer. He made his List A debut for the Windward Islands in the 2016–17 Regional Super50 on 10 February 2017. In October 2019, he was named in the Leeward Islands' squad for the 2019–20 Regional Super50 tournament.

References

External links
 

1989 births
Living people
Antigua and Barbuda cricketers
Leeward Islands cricketers
Windward Islands cricketers
Place of birth missing (living people)